Russ Joseph Kun (born 8 September 1975) is a Nauruan politician who has been president of Nauru since being elected in the 2022 presidential election.
He has served as a member of parliament for Ubenide since 2013.

Biography 
Kun was born on 8 September 1975. He served as a scrutineer for the 2003 and 2004 general elections. He served as acting Secretary for the Ministry of Commerce Industry & Resources in 2005. He served as acting Chief Secretary in 2008 and as acting Secretary of Home Affairs in 2012. Prior to entering Parliament, he worked for the Ministry of Commerce, Industry and Environment. Kun also was a member of the Nauru National Commission for UNESCO from 2008 to 2010 and from 2012 to 2013.  

Kun was first elected to the Parliament of Nauru in 2013, as one of the four members from Ubenide Constituency. He was re-elected in 2016, 2019, and 2022. In the last Aingimea government, Kun was deputy minister for Finance, Nauru Ports, Tourism, and National Heritage and Museum.

Kun is a member of the Global Organization of Parliamentarians Against Corruption (GOPAC). After attending a GOPAC workshop, he led efforts to develop a code of ethics for the Parliament of Nauru. To this end, he served as chair of the parliamentary Standing Committee on the Leadership Code.

In the first parliament sitting after the 2022 general election, Kun was the sole nominee for President of Nauru. He was sworn in along with his cabinet on 29 September. His own portfolios include foreign affairs and justice and border control.

References 

Living people
1975 births
People from Uaboe District
Members of the Parliament of Nauru
Presidents of Nauru
Government ministers of Nauru
Nauruan civil servants
21st-century Nauruan politicians